The following is a list of Texas University Interscholastic League State Marching Band Competition winners.

References

University Interscholastic League